George Peter Raitt was a professional footballer, who played for Huddersfield Town.

Raitt moved to Victoria in Australia where he played for Melbourne Thistle, winning premierships in 1914 and 1915 and the league-cup double in 1925. He captained the first touring Victorian state team in 1914 and continued to appear in representative teams for the state up to 1925.

Raitt played three internationals for Australia, his one full A-international coming in a loss to Canada in 1924 at the age of 35.

He died in 1960 in Melbourne.

Footnotes

References

1880s births
Footballers from Glasgow
Scottish footballers
Australia international soccer players
Association football defenders
English Football League players
Huddersfield Town A.F.C. players
1960 deaths
Scottish Junior Football Association players
Cambuslang Rangers F.C. players